Charlotte Harbor Preserve State Park is a  Florida State Park, composed of islands and land that surrounds Charlotte Harbor. It is part of the Southwest Florida Water Management District and protects the Gasparilla Sound/ Charlotte Harbor, Cape Haze, Matlacha Pass, and Pine Island Sound aquatic preserves. It is site 22 on southern section of the Great Florida Birding Trail and offers boating, paddling, fishing, and hiking.

The park can be accessed from Punta Gorda, Cape Coral, Cape Haze, El Jobean, Rotonda, and Little Pine Island.

Admission and Hours
There is no entrance charge. Florida state parks are open between 8 a.m. and sundown every day of the year (including holidays).

Gallery

References

External links
 Charlotte Harbor Preserve State Park at Florida State Parks

State parks of Florida
Parks in Charlotte County, Florida
Southwest Florida Water Management District reserves